Paula Slater is an American sculptor. She is most notable for her U.S. Military Working Dog Teams National Monument sculpture at Lackland Air Force Base in San Antonio, Texas (introduced to the United States Congress by Rep. Walter B. Jones and signed into law by George W. Bush), and for her public and privately commissioned busts and monuments, particularly around the Detroit area. She has been commissioned to sculpt several Congressmen and historical figures, such as Abraham Lincoln at the Abraham Lincoln Museum and Washington County Courthouse in Springfield, Kentucky, and Giulio Cesare Graziani in the Italian Air Force Museum in Rome. Other of her prominent works include the monument honoring Steven Stayner in Merced, California, and sculptures of Sohrab Aarabi and Neda Agha-Soltan in San Francisco.

Born in Fullerton, California, she obtained her Associate of Arts degree in Fine Art from the Orange Coast College in 1973. In 1976, she obtained her Bachelor of Arts, followed by her Master of Arts degree in 1988 from California State University and John F. Kennedy University, respectively.

She is a member of the National Sculpture Society, the National Museum of Women in the Arts and the Portrait Society of America.

References

External links

Military National Monument website
Lincoln monument website
National Portrait Society

American sculptors
Living people
Year of birth missing (living people)